Coisy is a commune in the Somme department in Hauts-de-France in northern France.

Geography

History
Coisy is first mentioned in the 12th century, when it was under the jurisdiction of the seigneurs of Beauquesne.

A Benedictine priory was established at the hamlet of Flesserolles in 1156, under Anchin Abbey.

By the end of the 14th century, Coisy was governed by the Bureau de la Rivière.

Protestant assemblies were set up in 1570.

Marshall Biron and his troops stopped here in 1597, during the French Wars of Religion.

Population

See also
Communes of the Somme department

References

External links

 Website of the community of communes of Bocage-hallue 

Communes of Somme (department)